Levan Maisashvili is a Georgian professional rugby union coach. He is currently the head coach of the Georgia national team and the  side that participates in the Currie Cup. While coach of the Georgian national team during the 2021 July rugby union tests, Maisashvili contracted COVID-19 and was seriously ill in hospital. He was in hospital for two months, after being placed on a ventilator with 'serious lung damage' having contracted the illness on 2 July 2021.

References

Living people
Year of birth missing (living people)
Rugby union coaches from Georgia (country)
Georgia national rugby union team coaches